|}

The Cambridgeshire Handicap is a flat handicap horse race in Great Britain open to horses aged three years or older. It is run on the Rowley Mile at Newmarket over a distance of 1 mile and 1 furlong (1,811 metres), and it is scheduled to take place each year in late September.

History
The event was established in 1839, and the inaugural running was won by Lanercost. It was founded in the same year as another major handicap at Newmarket, the Cesarewitch. The two races came to be known as the Autumn Double.

The Cesarewitch initially took place before the Cambridgeshire, but the schedule was later reversed and the Cambridgeshire now precedes the other race by two weeks. Three horses completed the double in the 19th century — Rosebery (1876), Foxhall (1881) and Plaisanterie (1885) — but the feat has been rarely attempted since then.

The Cambridgeshire Handicap is currently held on the final day of Newmarket's three-day Cambridgeshire Meeting.

Records

Most successful horse (2 wins):
 Hackler's Pride – 1903, 1904
 Christmas Daisy – 1909, 1910
 Sterope – 1948, 1949
 Prince de Galles – 1969, 1970
 Baronet – 1978, 1980
 Rambo's Hall – 1989, 1992
 Bronze Angel - 2012, 2014

Leading jockey (4 wins):
 Nat Flatman – Vulcan (1841), Evenus (1844), Alarm (1845), Scherz (1854)
 George Fordham – Little David (1853), Odd Trick (1857), See Saw (1868), Sabinus (1871)

Leading trainer (5 wins):
 John Gosden – Halling (1994), Pipedreamer (2007), Tazeez (2008), Wissahickon (2018), Lord North (2019)
 (note: the trainers of some of the early winners are unknown)

Winners since 1977
 Weights given in stones and pounds.

Earlier winners

 1839: Lanercost
 1840: Roscius
 1841: Vulcan
 1842: Ralph
 1843: Nat
 1844: Evenus
 1845: Alarm
 1846: Prior of St Margarets
 1847: The Widow
 1848: Dacia
 1849: Raby
 1850: Landgrave
 1851: Truth
 1852: Knight of the Shire
 1853: Little David
 1854: Scherz
 1855: Sultan
 1856: Malacca
 1857: Odd Trick
 1858: Eurydice
 1859: Red Eagle
 1860: Weatherbound
 1861: Palestro
 1862: Bathilde
 1863: Catch 'em Alive
 1864: Ackworth
 1865: Gardevisure
 1866: Actaea
 1867: Lozenge
 1868: See Saw
 1869: Vestminster
 1870: Adonis
 1871: Sabinus
 1872: Playfair
 1873: Montargis
 1874: Peut-etre
 1875: Sutton
 1876: Rosebery
 1877: Jongleur
 1878: Isonomy
 1879: La Merveille
 1880: Lucetta
 1881: Foxhall
 1882: Hackness
 1883: Bendigo
 1884: Florence
 1885: Plaisanterie
 1886: The Sailor Prince
 1887: Gloriation
 1888: Veracity
 1889: Laureate
 1890: Alicante
 1891: Comedy
 1892: La Fleche
 1893: Molly Morgan
 1894: Indian Queen
 1895: Marco
 1896: Winkfield's Pride
 1897: Comfrey
 1898: Georgic
 1899: Irish Ivy
 1900: Berrill
 1901: Watershed
 1902: Ballantrae
 1903: Hackler's Pride
 1904: Hackler's Pride
 1905: Velocity
 1906: Polymelus
 1907: Land League
 1908: Marcovil
 1909: Christmas Daisy
 1910: Christmas Daisy
 1911: Long Set
 1912: Adam Bede
 1913: Cantilever
 1914: Honeywood
 1915: Silver Tag
 1916: Eos
 1917: Brown Prince
 1918: Zinovia
 1919: Brigand
 1920: no race
 1921: Milenko
 1922: Re-echo
 1923: Verdict
 1924: Twelve Pointer
 1925: Masked Marvel
 1926: Insight
 1927: Medal / Niantic 1
 1928: Palais Royal
 1929: Double Life
 1930: The Pen
 1931: Disarmament
 1932: Pullover
 1933: Raymond
 1934: Wychwood Abbot
 1935: Commander
 1936: Dan Bulger
 1937: Artist's Prince
 1938: Helleniqua
 1939: i) Gyroscope, ii) Orichalque 2
 1940: Caxton 3
 1941: Rue de la Paix
 1942: no race
 1943: Quartier-Maitre
 1944: Hunsingore
 1945: Esquire
 1946: Sayani
 1947: Fairey Fulmar
 1948: Sterope
 1949: Sterope
 1950: Kelling
 1951: Fleeting Moment
 1952: Richer
 1953: Jupiter
 1954: Minstrel
 1955: Retrial
 1956: Loppylugs
 1957: Stephanotis
 1958: London Cry
 1959: Rexequus
 1960: Midsummer Night
 1961: Henry the Seventh / Violetta 4
 1962: Hidden Meaning
 1963: Commander in Chief
 1964: Hasty Cloud
 1965: Tarqogan
 1966: Dites
 1967: Lacquer
 1968: Emerilo
 1969: Prince de Galles
 1970: Prince de Galles
 1971: King Midas
 1972: Negus
 1973: Siliciana
 1974: Flying Nelly
 1975: Lottogift
 1976: Intermission

1 The 1927 race was a dead-heat and has joint winners.2 The 1939 event was split into two separate divisions.3 The 1940 running took place at Nottingham.4 The 1961 edition was a dead-heat and has joint winners.

See also
 Horse racing in Great Britain
 List of British flat horse races

References
 Paris-Turf: 
 Racing Post:

 galopp-sieger.de – Cambridgeshire Handicap.
 pedigreequery.com – Cambridgeshire Handicap – Newmarket.
 tbheritage.com – Cambridgeshire Stakes (Handicap).
 
 Race Recordings 

Flat races in Great Britain
Newmarket Racecourse
Open mile category horse races
Recurring sporting events established in 1839
1839 establishments in England